"I'll Be There" is the 51st single by Japanese boy band Arashi. It was released on April 19, 2017 under their record label J Storm. "I'll be there" was used as the theme song for the television drama Kizoku Tantei starring Arashi member Masaki Aiba. The single sold over 390,000 copies in its first week and topped the weekly Oricon Singles Chart. The single was certified Double Platinum by the Recording Industry Association of Japan (RIAJ).

Single information
"I'll Be There" was released in two editions: a regular edition and a limited edition. The regular edition contains the B-sides "unknown" and "Treasure of life", and the instrumentals for all three tracks. The limited edition contains the music video and making-of for "I'll be there", the B-side "Round and Round" and its instrumental, and a 16-page lyrics booklet . The album jacket covers for the two versions are different.

"I'll Be There" was used as the theme song for the television drama Kizoku Tantei starring Arashi member Masaki Aiba. The group performed the song on the music show FNS Music Festival in Spring on March 22, 2017.

Track listing

Chart performance
On April 24, 2017, "I'll be there" debuted at number sixty-one on the Billboard Japan Hot 100 chart and rose to number one on May 1, 2017. The single debuted at number one on the Oricon daily singles chart selling 225,383 copies upon its release and selling 393,555 copies by the end of the week, topping the Oricon weekly singles chart. The single debuted at number one on the Billboard Japan's top single sales chart selling 424,861 copies in its first week. In April 2017, the single was certified double platinum by RIAJ for shipments of 500,000 units.

Charts and certifications

Weekly charts

Sales and certifications

Release history

References

External links
I'll be there product information 
Hard Copy Sales Certifications (RIAJ)

2017 songs
Arashi songs
Japanese television drama theme songs
Songs written by Figge Boström